Syn-Tash (or Syntash) is a village in the Ysyk-Ata District of Chüy Region of Kyrgyzstan. Its population was 1,023 in 2021.

References

Populated places in Chüy Region